Graeme Geddes is a former Grand Prix motorcycle racer from Australia.

Career statistics

By season

References

External links
 Profile on motogp.com

Living people
1960 births
Australian motorcycle racers
250cc World Championship riders
350cc World Championship riders